Cleburne is an unincorporated community in Six Mile Township, Franklin County, Illinois, United States.

References

Unincorporated communities in Franklin County, Illinois
Unincorporated communities in Illinois